Sambo's Grave is the burial site of a dark-skinned cabin boy or slave on unconsecrated ground in a field near the small village of Sunderland Point, Lancashire, England. Sunderland Point was a port, serving cotton, sugar and slave ships from the West Indies and North America, which declined after Glasson Dock was opened in 1787. It is a very small community only accessible via a narrow road, which crosses a salt marsh and is cut off at high tide.

History

In the early 18th century Sunderland Point was a port for Lancaster, serving ships too large to sail up to the town. According to the Lonsdale Magazine of 1822, which appears to rely on the then oral history, Sambo had arrived around 1736 from the West Indies as a servant to the captain of an unnamed ship:

It has also been suggested that Sambo may have died from a disease to which he had no natural immunity, contracted from contact with Europeans. He was buried in unconsecrated ground (as he was not a Christian) on the weatherbeaten shoreline of Morecambe Bay.

Plaque

With the opening of Glasson Dock in 1787, trade ships deserted Sunderland Point and it became a sea-bathing place and holiday venue. Sixty years after the burial, a retired headmaster of Lancaster boys' grammar school, James Watson, heard the story and raised money from summer visitors to the area for a memorial, to be placed on the unmarked grave. Watson, who was the brother of the prominent Lancaster slave trader, William Watson, also wrote the epitaph that now marks the grave (note the use of ſ, the long s character, and the eccentric and inconsistent spelling typical of the time):

The present plaque is a modern replica, replacing the original which had been stolen. This is explained by a smaller plaque, set immediately above the main plaque, which reads:

Preservation  

Official signposts on Sunderland Point define the grave and locality as a tourist attraction. The grave almost always bears flowers or stones painted by local children. The grave was enclosed by a low stone wall in 2019 and Chris Drury's 'Horizon Line Chamber' was built on the approach path.

References

External links

Sunderland Point and Samboo's Grave
"Sambo" 1657, antedates OED 1704-
The Graves of Slaves & other Black People in 18th C Britain

History of Lancaster
Burials in Lancashire
British slaves
Samboo
Year of birth unknown